The Way Up is the eleventh and final studio album by the Pat Metheny Group. It was released in 2005 and won the Grammy Award for Best Contemporary Jazz Album in 2006. It is the last Pat Metheny album to feature long-time collaborator Lyle Mays.

Background
The album consists of one 68-minute-long piece, split into four tracks. The album is a showcase for the band's ability in solo improvisation and dynamics. Swiss multi-instrumentalist Gregoire Maret joined the Group for the album's recording and tour, being showcased on the harmonica.

As part of the album's promotional tour, the Group performed at the Montreal Jazz Festival and a concert was recorded in South Korea and released on DVD.

Track listing

Personnel
 Pat Metheny – acoustic guitars, electric guitars, guitar synthesizer, slide guitar, toy guitar, producer
 Lyle Mays – piano, keyboards, toy xylophone, producer
 Steve Rodby – acoustic bass, electric bass, cello, violin, producer
 Cuong Vu – trumpet, voice, toy whistle
 Grégoire Maret – harmonica
 Antonio Sánchez – drums, toy xylophone
Additional musicians
 Richard Bona – percussion, voice, toy guitar
 Dave Samuels – percussion

Awards
Grammy Awards

Video

Personnel

 Pat Metheny – guitars, guitar synthesizer
 Lyle Mays – piano, keyboards
 Steve Rodby – acoustic bass, electric bass
 Antonio Sanchez – drums, percussion, electric bass
 Cuong Vu – trumpet, vocals, percussion, guitar, glockenspiel
 Grégoire Maret – harmonica, guitar, vocals, percussion, electric bass, marimba, kalimba
 Nando Lauria – guitar, vocals, percussion, vibraphone, flugelhorn, melodica, kalimba

Credits
Running time: 91 minutes
Recorded live in LG Arts Center, Seoul, Korea, 2005
Directed and edited by Steve Rodby
Produced by Pat Metheny
Executive producers – Ted Kurland and David Sholemson
Recorded by Pete Karam and David Oakes
Mixed by Rob Eaton
An Eagle Eye Media release. Eagle Eye Media a division of Eagle Rock Entertainment Ltd.

References

Pat Metheny albums
2005 albums
Nonesuch Records albums
Grammy Award for Best Contemporary Jazz Album